Carlos Cruz Gemora (June 15, 1903 – August 19, 1961), commonly known as Charles Gemora, was a Hollywood makeup artist renowned as "the King of the Gorilla Men" for his prolific appearances in many Hollywood films while wearing a gorilla suit.

Biography
Gemora was born on the island of Negros, Philippines, and arrived in San Francisco as a stowaway. He quickly found work on a fruit farm in Colusa, California but later moved to Los Angeles. He earned money doing portrait sketches outside of Universal Studios where his talents were discovered and put to work in the studio's sculpture department for The Hunchback of Notre Dame (1923). Gemora found his 5'4"/163 cm stature made him a natural to wear a gorilla suit, which he did, beginning with The Leopard Lady (1928).

Gemora's study of real gorillas at the San Diego Zoo and his expertise on makeup gave him an extensive career as a gorilla opposite actors including Our Gang (Bear Shooters), Lon Chaney (The Unholy Three), Bela Lugosi (Murders in the Rue Morgue), Laurel and Hardy, (The Chimp & Swiss Miss), The Marx Brothers (At the Circus), Bob Hope and Bing Crosby (Road to Zanzibar), The Great Gildersleeve (Gildersleeve's Ghost), Abbott and Costello (Africa Screams) and Robert Mitchum (White Witch Doctor).

With men in gorilla suits no longer providing the same scares in the 1950s as they did in the 1930s/1940s, Gemora moved into science fiction films such as the Martian in War of the Worlds and I Married a Monster from Outer Space.

Death
Gemora died of a heart attack in August 1961 while he was working on the makeup for Jack the Giant Killer.

References

External links
Profile of Gemora; accessed March 7, 2015. 
Uncredited: Charlie Gemora (2016 documentary by Jason Barnett); accessed March 8, 2021.

1903 births
1961 deaths
American make-up artists
Filipino emigrants to the United States
Special effects people
20th-century American male actors
Male actors from Negros Occidental